The 2016 Melon Music Awards ceremony, organized by Kakao M (a Kakao company) through its online music store Melon, took place on Saturday, November 19, 2016, in Seoul, South Korea. The eighth installment of the event since its offline launch in 2009, it was held at the Gocheok Sky Dome for the first time, which is one of the largest indoor concert venues in South Korea.

Details for the ceremony—including the announcement of its date and venue—were first made available on October 7, 2016. A list of nominations and the awardees for the Top 10 Artists were announced on November 4, with voting for the main awards beginning the same day.

The criteria for the awards varied depending on the category, consisting a mixture of digital sales data, judges evaluation, and online voting. Exo received the most nominations of the night, winning four of the six nominated categories. BTS, GFriend and Twice followed with the second most nominations with five each, while Zico received the second most awards, having won three times. Furthermore, BTS, Exo and Twice received the three daesang prizes of the night.

Judging criteria

Performers

Winners and nominees

Main awards 
Winners and nominees are listed below. Winners are listed first and emphasized in bold.

Other awards

Stats

Artists with multiple nominations 
6 nominations
 Exo

5 nominations
 BTS
 GFriend
 Twice

3 nominations
 AKMU
 Bewhy
 Jang Beom-june
 Mamamoo
 Red Velvet

2 nominations
 I.O.I
 Psy
 Seventeen
 Winner

Artists with multiple awards 
5 awards
 Exo

3 awards
 Zico

2 awards
 BTS
 GFriend
 Red Velvet
 Twice

Gallery

References

External links 

 Official website

2016 music awards
Melon Music Awards ceremonies
Annual events in South Korea